Kingsley is a village in southern Grand Traverse County in the U.S. state of Michigan. The population was 1,431 at the 2020 census. The village is located within Paradise Township and is part of the Traverse City micropolitan area.

History 
The land Kingsley sits on today was originally owned by its founders, Judson Kingsley and Myron S. Brownson. In 1872, the Pennsylvania Railroad was completed between Cadillac and Traverse City. Kingsley built a station for the new railroad, which happened to run through his property. Kingsley also opened a post office, known as Kingsley Station. In 1876, Judson Kingsley platted Kingsley Station as a new village under the shortened name of Kingsley.

In 1874, Brownson, a practicing medic from Steuben County, New York, bought land adjacent to that of Kingsley. In July 1882, Brownson platted his land into a new settlement he called Paradise. In 1893, the villages of Kingsley and Paradise united and incorporated under the name of Kingsley.

Geography

The Kingsley ZIP code, 49649, serves the majority of Paradise Township, as well as the southwest corner of Union Township, the western portion of Fife Lake Township, a portion of northern Greenwood Township, the northeast corner of Hanover Township, a large portion of western Mayfield Township, and the southwest corner of Blair Township.

Government 
The village president of Kingsley is Mary Lajko, who has served since 2022. The president pro tempore is Eric Weger, and village trustees are Gabe Bogart, Chris Bott, Chris McPherson, Cortney Wallace, and Dan Walton.

Demographics

2010 census
As of the census of 2010, there were 1,480 people, 519 households, and 380 families living in the village. The racial makeup of the village was 95.6% White, 0.7% African American, 1.1% Native American, 0.1% Asian, 0.2% Pacific Islander, 0.1% from other races, and 2.2% from two or more races. Hispanic or Latino of any race were 2.4% of the population.

There were 519 households, of which 45.3% had children under the age of 18 living with them, 48.7% were married couples living together, 17.1% had a female householder with no husband present, 7.3% had a male householder with no wife present, and 26.8% were non-families. 21.4% of all households were made up of individuals, and 8.1% had someone living alone who was 65 years of age or older. The average household size was 2.83 and the average family size was 3.26.

The median age in the village was 32.6 years. 31.4% of residents were under the age of 18; 9.2% were between the ages of 18 and 24; 27.7% were from 25 to 44; 22.1% were from 45 to 64; and 9.5% were 65 years of age or older. The gender makeup of the village was 48.1% male and 51.9% female.

2000 census
As of the census of 2000, there were 1,469 people, 501 households, and 375 families living in the village. The racial makeup of the village was 97.28% White, 0.27% African American, 0.82% Native American, 0.75% from other races, and 0.88% from two or more races. Hispanic or Latino of any race were 1.77% of the population.

There were 501 households, out of which 47.5% had children under the age of 18 living with them, 56.3% were married couples living together, 15.0% had a female householder with no husband present, and 25.1% were non-families. 19.0% of all households were made up of individuals, and 6.6% had someone living alone who was 65 years of age or older.  The average household size was 2.90 and the average family size was 3.31.

In the village, the population was spread out, with 33.9% under the age of 18, 9.9% from 18 to 24, 33.6% from 25 to 44, 15.5% from 45 to 64, and 7.1% who were 65 years of age or older.  The median age was 28 years. For every 100 females, there were 88.1 males.  For every 100 females age 18 and over, there were 90.4 males.

The median income for a household in the village was $40,229, and the median income for a family was undetermined. Males had a median income of more than females. The per capita income for the village was $16,508.  About 17.3% of the population were below the poverty line.

Climate 
This climatic region has large seasonal temperature differences, with warm to hot (and often humid) summers and cold (sometimes severely cold) winters.  According to the Köppen Climate Classification system, Kingsley has a humid continental climate, abbreviated "Dfb" on climate maps.

Education 
Kingsley is served by the Kingsley Area Schools district with Kingsley Elementary, Kingsley Middle, and Kingsley High schools. Kingsley's sports teams are known as the "Stags", and their official colors are orange and black. The orange and black motif can be seen adorning buildings throughout the village.

Transportation

The nearest airport to Kingsley with commercial service is Traverse City's Cherry Capital Airport. This airport offers year-round service to Detroit and Chicago–O'Hare, as well as seasonal service to a number of additional locations.

Kingsley was formerly a station on the Grand Rapids and Indiana Railroad. Today, it is served by the Great Lakes Central Railroad. However, Kingsley is no longer a station.

M-113 runs east–west through downtown Kingsley as Main Street. M-113 serves as a connector between US 131 and M-37, two major north–south routes. East of Kingsley, M-113 has a junction with the shorter M-186, another short east–west route that can be used to access Fife Lake.

References

External links 

 Kingsley | Michigan

Villages in Grand Traverse County, Michigan
Villages in Michigan
Traverse City micropolitan area
1872 establishments in Michigan
Populated places established in 1872